Joseph Lewis Ballham (c.1864 – 1948) was an English footballer. He won the Football Alliance title with Stoke in 1890–91, and also played for Burslem Port Vale. His brother Edgar played a friendly for Port Vale in 1890.

Career
Ballham played for Stoke Locomotive and Stoke, appearing in the FA Cup in 1886–87 and 1887–88, before joining Burslem Port Vale in August 1888. However, he was still under contract to Stoke until the end of September that year and so had to wait until October to make his debut. The contract issue did not go away and in December 1888 he was forced to pay the club £20 damages and costs at £1 a week by the Stoke County Court. Despite this, and the regular football he enjoyed at Vale he returned to their rivals in the summer of 1890. He had scored 29 goals in 70 games in all competitions for the Vale. He scored six goals in 20 Football Alliance games in 1890–91, as Stoke won the league title and regained admittance to the Football League. He scored five goals in 18 Football League games in 1891–92, before departing the Victoria Ground.

Career statistics 
Source:

Honours
Stoke
Football Alliance: 1890–91

References

1864 births
1948 deaths
Footballers from Stoke-on-Trent
English footballers
Association football forwards
Stoke City F.C. players
Port Vale F.C. players
English Football League players
Football Alliance players